Two Yanks in Trinidad is a 1942 American comedy spy film directed by Gregory Ratoff and starring Pat O'Brien, Brian Donlevy and Janet Blair.

The film was in production when Pearl Harbor was attacked by the Japanese, leading to America's entry into World War II.

Plot
Two gangsters have a fight over a woman, and separately decided to join the US Army. While stationed in Trinidad they join forces to thwart a plan by Nazi agents to smuggle oil out of the island.

Cast

 Pat O'Brien as Tim Reardon  
 Brian Donlevy as Vince Barrows  
 Janet Blair as Patricia Dare  
 Roger Clark as James W. Buckingham III  
 Donald MacBride as Sgt. Valentine 
 John Emery as Chicago Hagen  
 Frank Jenks as Joe Scavenger  
 Frank Sully as Mike Paradise 
 Veda Ann Borg as Bubbles  
 Clyde Fillmore as Col. Powers  
 Dick Curtis as Sea Captain 
 Sig Arno as Maitre d'
 Emory Parnell as Police Chief

References

Bibliography
 Koszarski, Richard. Hollywood on the Hudson: Film and Television in New York from Griffith to Sarnoff. Rutgers University Press, 2008.  
 Langman, Larry. Destination Hollywood: The Influence of Europeans on American Filmmaking. McFarland, 2000.

External links

1942 films
American spy comedy films
American spy films
American black-and-white films
1940s spy comedy films
1940s spy films
Films directed by Gregory Ratoff
Columbia Pictures films
Films set in Trinidad and Tobago
World War II films made in wartime
Films produced by Samuel Bischoff
Films scored by John Leipold
1942 comedy films
1940s English-language films